The Rock Machine Motorcycle Club (RMMC) or Rock Machine is an international outlaw motorcycle club founded in Montreal, Quebec, Canada in 1986. It has twenty one Canadian chapters spread across seven provinces.  It also has nine chapters in the United States and eleven chapters in Australia, with chapters also located in 24 other countries worldwide. It was formed in 1986, by Salvatore Cazzetta and his brother Giovanni Cazzetta. The Rock Machine competed with the Hells Angels for control of the street-level narcotics trade in Quebec. The Quebec Biker War saw the Rock Machine form an alliance with a number of other organizations to face the Hells Angels. The conflict occurred between 1994 and 2002 and resulted in over 160 deaths and over 300 injured. An additional 100+ have been imprisoned.

Common nicknames for the organization include "R.M.", "Black & Platinum", "RMMC", and "1813". The official Rock Machine club motto is "À La Vie À La Mort", or "To the Life Until Death". The club also possesses a patch that reads "RMFFRM" which stands for "Rock Machine Forever, Forever Rock Machine",  an extremely common tradition among outlaw motorcycle clubs.

The Rock Machine Motorcycle Club gained the status of a "Hang-around" club in May 1999 and after eighteen months, became a probationary chapter of the Bandidos Motorcycle Club on December 1, 2000. Bandidos National Officer Edward Winterhalder was put in charge of overseeing the transition by Bandidos International President, George Wegers. The original version of the Rock Machine (1986-1999) in Canada changed their colors from black and platinum to red and gold in May 1999; their colors remained red and gold until they became "Full-Patch" Bandidos on December 1, 2001. In a "patch-over" ceremony at the Rock Machine's Kingston chapter clubhouse.

A second iteration of the Rock Machine was founded in late 2008, under the leadership of Sean "Crazy Dog" Brown, they adopted the original black and platinum colours as their patch.

The club's racial policy is all-inclusive and possesses members from several different ethnicities around the world, including African Canadian/Americans.  Despite the group's use of the Waffen SS's double lightning bolt on one of their patches, it is mainly to show respect to the club's historical roots as opposed to the racial meaning of the symbol, due to large numbers of their founding members being a part of the SS Motorcycle Club.  It is also worn due to its status in the motorcycle community. It is seen as an outlaw symbol, as society dictates people should not wear it, thus outlaws usually wear it as a sign of rebellion against societal standards, as opposed to racial ideology.

Since 2007. The club has spread across Canada and throughout several other countries worldwide, including the United States, Australia, Germany, Russia, Switzerland, Hungary, Belgium, New Zealand, Sweden, Serbia, Norway, France, South Africa, England, Spain, Georgia, Hong Kong, Kosovo, Kuwait, Armenia, Brazil, Indonesia, Thailand, Vietnam, Philippines and Turkey. As of 2022, the Rock Machine Motorcycle Club has established over 200 chapters on 5 continents since its inception. In the 2000s, the Rock Machine allied themselves with fellow international Canadian motorcycle club the Loners Motorcycle Club.

Early history

The SS Motorcycle Club or had initially been established under the name, Outlaws Motorcycle Club (No relation to US based club). They eventually changed their name to the SS in 1978, this was due to wanting to differentiate themselves following the entry of the Outlaws Motorcycle Club into Canada in 1977. Paul Porter who would be a founding member of the Rock Machine, belonged to the Executioners Motorcycle Club. In 1984, he would leave the Executioners and form his own motorcycle club, the Merciless Riders. They would soon merge with the SS Motorcycle Club and the group began going by the name SS Merciless Riders.
In approximately 1982, Salvatore Cazzetta a member of the SS, which was a white supremacist motorcycle gang based in Pointe-aux-Trembles, on the eastern tip of the Island of Montreal the club was also known as the SS Merciless Riders. Fellow SS member Maurice Boucher became friends with Cazzetta and as leaders of the club, the pair became candidates to join the Hells Angels when that club expanded into Canada. Giovanni Cazzetta had joined the Outlaws Motorcycle Club at a young age and had been involved in the First Biker War, he had remained a member of the organization in Quebec until 1984, when he left to join his brother in the SS Motorcycle Club.

A Lennoxville, Quebec, chapter of the Hells Angels suspected in March 1985 that the Laval chapter was interfering with drug profits through personal use of products intended for sale. It is believed that the Laval chapter's invitation to a Lennoxville chapter party led to the ambush and death of five Laval members. Divers located the decomposing bodies of the victims at the bottom of the St. Lawrence River, wrapped in sleeping bags and tied to weightlifting plates, two months after the party. The event became known as the "Lennoxville massacre," and its extreme nature earned the Quebec chapter of the Hells Angels a notorious reputation. Cazzetta considered the event an unforgivable breach of the outlaw code and, rather than joining the Hells Angels, in 1986 formed his own club, the Rock Machine, with his brother Giovanni. They recruited some of the best talent around and formed alliances  with the Rizzuto crime family, the West End Gang, and the Dubois Gang. Giovanni Cazzetta would  hold the position of  second-in-command. Only Salvatore would hold more influence. The Cazzetta brothers brought together former members of the SS Merciless Riders and the Executioners MC, who would make up the Rock Machine's initial organization and hierarchy. Despite the initial high amount of outlaw bikers, the Rock Machine did not consider itself an official motorcycle club until the 1990s. In 1988, members of the Pacific Rebels Motorcycle Club, under Claude Vézina joined the Rock Machine, becoming their Quebec City chapter.

Future Rock Machine National President, Fred Faucher later said, "Sal once told me, 'Those guys (Hells Angels), they operate their club in such a way that I didn't want to join them'". The founding members of the Rock Machine were Salvatore Cazzettta, his younger brother Giovanni and a few close friends of theirs, many of whom were members of the SS Motorcycle Club. Other founding members included Paul "Sasquatch" Porter, Johnny Plescio, Andrew "Curly" Sauvageau, Renaud Jomphe, Gilles Lambert, Martin Bourget, Richard "Bam Bam" Lagacé, Serge Pinel and several others.On the surface, the Rock Machine ran operations like tattoo parlors and bars, as well as motorcycle repair shops, what the group truly profited off was the sale of narcotics and other prohibited goods. As the Rock Machine charged much less for their cocaine than the Hells Angels did, the gang quickly won much market share in the Montreal area. The Hells Angels had been badly weakened by the Lennoxville massacre on 24 March 1985, when five members of the Angels' chapter in Laval were shot by their colleagues, afterward the vacuum was filled by a number of Montreal-based organized crime groups most prominent being the Rock Machine, and it was not until the early 1990s that the Angels became a major force in Montreal organized crime again. Initially Rock Machine members chose not to wear Hells Angels-style leather vests that could easily identify members, and instead wore rings displaying an eagle insignia (this would last until the 1995, with the adoption of three-piece vests).  

The official Rock Machine club motto is "A La Vie A La Mort", or "To the Life Until Death". The club the possesses a patch that reads "RMFFRM" which stands for "Rock Machine Forever, Forever Rock Machine",  an extremely common thing among outlaw motorcycle clubs.

The Rock Machine mother chapter, lead by Salvatore and Giovanni, possessed a secure bunker in the Centre-Sud from 1992 to 1997. It was located on Huron Street, near Papineau and St. Catherine. Which contributed to a bad reputation for poverty, organized crime and prostitution that the neighborhood was known for. The Huron Street clubhouse was rumored to have a subterranean bunker below, with an extensive tunnel system. The building was eventually condemned by police, after it was damaged by bomb in October 1995, after that the Rock Machine Montreal chapter would operate out of the suburb of Verdun. It was demolished in 2001, to make room for the creation of a new green space near the Jacques Cartier Bridge.

In April 1992, Giovanni Cazzetta was arrested by police and charged with trafficking narcotics, police found him to be in position of three kilograms of cocaine worth around $120,000(modern equivalent when adjusting for inflation of $246,000 US). He was forced to plead guilty to four charges the following spring and would be sentenced to four years in prison, Giovanni was released in 1997 and briefly participated in the conflict that was to come. Marice Boucher, was released after finishing a forty-month sentence for armed sexual assault, joined the Hells Angels and was subsequently promoted within the club's ranks. The Hells Angels and Rock Machine co-existed peacefully for many years, a situation that, according to police officials, was due to Boucher's respect for his friend, Cazzetta and the latter's connections with the Quebec Mafia, the only organized crime group that the motorcycle gangs were unwilling to attack.

Quebec Biker war
 
Founder of the Rock Machine Motorcycle Club, Salvatore Cazzetta was arrested at a pitbull farm located in Fort Erie, Ontario during 1994. He was charged with attempting to import more than eleven tons (22,000lbs) of cocaine valued at an estimated 275 million dollars US (adjusting for inflation the 2021 value is $513,238,697). Claude Vézina, who was President of the Quebec City chapter at the time, became the new National President of the Rock Machine. Renaud Jomphe was made President of the Montreal chapter, while Marcel Demers became the President of the Quebec City chapter until eventually opening the Beauport chapter in late 1996.

Recently promoted Hells Angels Montreal President Boucher began to increase pressure on the Rock Machine shortly after the arrest, which initiated the Quebec Biker war. The local Rock Machine Motorcycle Club formed an affiliation, the Alliance, with Montreal crime families such as the Pelletier Clan, Dark Circle and other independent dealers who wished to resist the Hells Angels' attempts to establish a monopoly on street-level drug trade in the city. A violent turf war ensued with the Hells Angels. The Rock Machine MC, its support clubs and the Pelletier Clan would provide manpower, while the Dark Circle would provide the funding. The Dark Circle's leadership was ruled by a committee of five. The chairman was Michel Duclos.

Boucher organized "puppet clubs" to persuade Rock Machine-controlled bars and their resident drug dealers to surrender their illegal drug business. This led to the creation of The Palmers MC, a Rock Machine MC support club with chapters in Montreal and Quebec City, it was created to counter Hell's Angels allies, the Rockers MC, Evil ones and Death Riders MC support clubs. It was led and organized by Rock Machine members Jean "Le Francais" Duquaire and André “Dédé” Désormeaux, who was initially a member of the Dark Circle but joined the Rock Machine, these two were described as the grandfathers of the Palmers MC, all of its members would be patched into the Rock Machine in 2000. The starting point of the conflict is disputed; however on July 13, 1994, three members of the Rock Machine entered a business in downtown Montreal. They assassinated Pierre Daoust, a member of a Hells Angel support club, the Death Riders Motorcycle Club. Once it was confirmed they had the right target he was shot 16 times in the head and torso.

There was very little coverage over this incident however many in Montreal's underground knew that the Rock Machine was defending its territory, months before the death of Daoust. The members of the Alliance (Rock Machine MC, Pelletier Clan, The Dark Circle) as well as other individual narcotics dealers and street gangs all met to discuss a united front against the Hells Angels after they gave the narcotics community of Quebec an ultimatum to have them as their mandatory supplier of all contraband goods and narcotics. This offer was refused and the Alliance was formed; due to the Hells Angels' "monopolistic attitude" they had decided to take the initiative and strike first.

A day after on July 14, 1994, The Rock Machine attempted to assassinate Normand Robitaille, a member of Hells Angels support club the Rockers MC and a future and prominent member of the Hells Angels. The attempt failed and Quebec police announced that they had arrested five members of the Rock Machine Motorcycle Club for planning to bomb the Evil Ones MC clubhouse which was also aligned with the Hells Angels.

With current knowledge of events due to information from Sylvain Boulanger, it is known that on July 15, 1994, the hierarchy of the Hells Angels in Quebec held emergency meetings in the city of Longueuil, Quebec. All four chapters in Quebec at the time were present (Montreal, Quebec City, Trois-Rivières and Sherbrooke). There was also a meeting at Hells Angels bunker during this period of time.  All chapters had to cast a vote on whether or not they would participate in the conflict against the Rock Machine and their alliance. All four chapters agreed and the club began to prepare for the long conflict ahead. The Hells Angels was an international organization and received aid from all over the country and internationally, giving them more support than the Rock Machine.

On 19 October 1994, a local drug dealer Maurice Lavoie was gunned down in his car and his girlfriend was wounded. Lavoie had previously been buying his wares from the Pelletier Clan associated with the Rock Machine, but had recently switched to the Hells Angels, and as a result the Pelletier Clan hired a hitman named Patrick Call to kill Lavoie.

On 28 October 1994, Sylvain Pelletier, the leader of the Pelletier Clan, was killed by the Hells Angels, who threatened to murder any drug dealer who did not buy their supplies from them. After these killings, an increasingly murderous struggle for the control of the drug trade in Montreal began between the Hells Angels and the Rock Machine that would see 20 dead before the end of 1994.

After Pelletier was killed, the independent drug dealers of Montreal formed the "Alliance to fight the Angels" headed by his younger brother, Harold Pelletier, whose first act was an attempt to assassinate Boucher in November 1994. Another member of the Pelletier Clan, Martin Simard, purchased enough stolen dynamite to fill a truck, which was left near Boucher's favorite restaurant by Alliance member Martin Pellerin. The plan was to set off the explosives by remote control when Boucher arrived, killing him and everybody else in the restaurant, but a Montreal parking officer noticed the truck was parked illegally and had it towed, thus unknowingly foiling the plot.

On 24 June 1995, Boucher founded the Nomads, an elite chapter of the Angels, that unlike the other chapters, had no geographical limit and were to operate all over Canada. To join the Nomads, applicants were required to commit murders, which ensured that no undercover police agents could enter the Nomads chapter. Additionally, only the highest-quality Angels who had proven themselves could join the Nomads.

On August 13, 1995, a Jeep wired with a remote-controlled bomb exploded, killing Hells Angels associate Marc Dube and an 11-year-old boy, Daniel Desrochers, who was playing in a nearby schoolyard, An Interpol informant claimed that the plan was created and facilitated by Boucher to earn back public credit. The first Full-Patch Hells Angels member was shot to death entering his car at a shopping mall a month later. Nine bombs went off around the province during his funeral targeting several Hells Angels businesses and properties.  This series of violence related to Operation Wolverine, a police crackdown on both groups in which 130 were arrested.

in October 1995, Harold Pelletier, one of the heads of the Pelletier Clan(Member of the Alliance), turned himself in to the Sûreté du Québec, confessing that on the night of 7 August 1983, he murdered a drug dealer named Michel Beaulieu who was behind in his payments to the Pelletier Clan, and asked that the police provide him with protection from the Angels in exchange for more information about his crimes.

Ultimately, Pelletier confessed to committing 17 murders between 1983 and 1995, yet he was convicted only of the murder of Beaulieu. Pelletier's murder of Beaulieu was classified as second degree murder, despite the fact Beaulieu had fallen asleep after Pelletier got him drunk before he was shot. Since the murder was premeditated, it should have been classified as a first degree murder.

In his plea bargain struck in June 1996, Pelletier was sentenced to life imprisonment with a promise that he receive full parole after 10 years served, in exchange for which he shared all he knew about the Montreal underworld. The Crown justified the plea bargain with Pelletier, given that he was guilty of 17 murders, on the grounds he was a "mine of information" about the underworld of Montreal. Pelletier's motives for striking a plea bargain was that the "Alliance against the Angels" was collapsing with Alliance members defecting over to the Angels, and he wanted Crown protection from the Angels. However, Pelletier violated the terms of his plea bargain, under which he promised not to commit any more crimes, when he was caught in 2002 attempting to bribe another prison inmate to kill a prisoner whom he disliked, allowing the Crown to revoke its agreement and Pelletier was not released in June 2006 as was promised 10 years earlier. Pelletier finally received full parole in December 2013 after he completed his high school equivalency degree, started attending Alcoholics Anonymous meetings, and demonstrated an ability to get along with penitentiary staff.

On 18 October 1996. President of the Rock Machine Montreal chapter, Renaud Jomphe was shot and killed. The Rock Machine leader was seated with fellow club members Christian Deschenes and Raymond Laureau in a booth at the rear of a Chinese restaurant known as Restaurant Kim Hoa, located on Wellington Street. A man entered the establishment and approached the table, fired several shots, and fled out the rear of the building. Jomphe and Deschenes were killed, while Laureau was wounded in the shoulder. One of the Paradis Brothers, Peter Paradis, would succeed Jomphe as president of the Montreal chapter, taking over much of his business in the suburb of Verdun.

In November 1996, the Rock Machine planted a bomb in the old Hells Angels bunker in St. Nicholas and the residential neighborhood where it was located was shaken by the immense force of the blast. The bunker received significant damage.

On 28 March 1997, Rocker member Aimé Simard, stating he was acting under the orders of the Rocker president, a man known as Gregory "Pissaro" Wooley, murdered Rock Machine member Jean-Marc Caissy as he entered a Montreal arena to play hockey with his friends.

In early 1997, Giovanni Cazzetta was released from prison, he would return to the Rock Machine, Claude Vézina willing stepped down and Giovanni was given the position of National President in his brother's absence. He would lead the club through the conflict until May 1997. In May Giovanni was subject to a police sting in which a man from Alberta attempted to purchase 15 kilos of cocaine(valued at $600,000, adjusting for inflation the modern equivalent of $1,132,000). This individual turned out to be an informant for the crown. The mules Frank Bonneville and Donald Waite, that delivered the cocaine to the informant were arrested and the narcotics seized by police, Matticks, Bonneville and Waite pled guilty on June 17, 1997, and were sentenced to three, four, and two years respectively. Claude Vézina would be momentarily reinstated as National president of the Rock Machine. Giovanni attempted to fight the charges brought against him, however he would lose these appeals, he was sentenced to 5 years prison time in April 1998. While  Maria Cazzetta, Giovanni's sister and  Suzanne Poudrier received one year conditional sentences

On May 19, 1997. Prominent Rock Machine member Serge Cyr was placed under arrest and charged with conspiracy along with 13 others including members of the Rock Machine, Pelletier Clan and Palmers MC for planning the murder of Hells Angels president Maurice "Mom" Boucher. In 1994, a stolen van loaded with explosives was discovered outside the Cri-Cri restaurant on St. Catherine Street, the restaurant was an establishment that Boucher often ate at. Cyr was released soon after, with the  condition that he would report to police once a week, which he never did. Cyr gained a reputation from this and after the December 2000 arrests, he was promoted to president of the Montreal chapter.

On 21 May 1997, Claude Vézina and his sergeant-at-arms Dany "Le Gros" Légaré were both charged with the trafficking of narcotics. In order to conduct his arrest, police had to sneak by guard dogs that he had located on his property; they entered his home and arrested him in his bedroom. This was all the result of a sting operation set up by the Quebec police. A police informant had completed seven transactions of narcotics with the two members of Rock Machine, during a five-month period. The massive raid launched by authorities as part of Operation Carcajou resulted in the seizure of a laboratory where narcotics such as PCP and methamphetamine were produced. $1,500,000 worth of various other narcotics, over 325 kg (716.5 lbs) of dynamite along with detonators, seven pistols, two fully automatic machine guns, three semi-automatic carbines and a pistol suppressor. After the arrest of Vézina, Frédéric Faucher became the Rock Machine's new national president on 11 September 1997, Alain "Red Tomato" Brunette was promoted to president of the Quebec City chapter.

In mid 1997, an imprisoned Hells Angel, Denis Houle, was the victim of an unsuccessful assassination attempt when a Rock Machine member opened fire on him from beyond the prison fence. The resulting investigation first alerted the public to the existence of the Dark Circle, and it was reported the Hells Angels would pay well for information identifying the members of the Dark Circle. Over the next two years, two members of the Dark Circle were murdered by the Hells Angels while a third escaped when the Hells Angels shot and killed the wrong Serge.

As the war turned into a battle of attrition the Hells Angels began to gain the upper hand as ever-increasing levels of support poured in from around Canada and internationally, but at the same time, the Great Nordic Biker War was taking place, and the Rock Machine was impressed with the way that the Scandinavian branches of the Bandidos held their own against the Scandinavian branches of the Hells Angels. In June 1997, the three leaders of the Rock Machine, Fred Faucher, Johnny Plescio, and Robert "Tout Tout" Léger, went to Stockholm to seek support from the Swedish branch of the Bandidos, but were expelled by the Swedish police, who declared that they did not want Canadian bikers in their country.

Faucher, had been the President of the Rock Machine Quebec City chapter prior to his promotion to National President, he had gained wide attention in underworld circles by blowing up the Hells Angels clubhouse in Quebec City in February 1997 and after the Rock Machine's leader Claude "Ti-Loup" Vézina was arrested for drug smuggling, he became the Rock Machine's new leader on 11 September 1997. Faucher decided the best hope for the Rock Machine was to have the club absorbed into the Bandidos, the second-largest outlaw biker club in the world.

On 23 August 1998, a team of Rock Machine killers consisting of Frédéric Faucher, Gerald Gallant, and Marcel Demers rode by on their motorcycles and gunned down Paolo Cotroni in his driveway.  Cotroni was killed partly to gain the favor of the Rizzutos and partly because he was a friend of Boucher.

On 8 September 1998, Johnny Plescio, a founding member of the Rock Machine, was at his Laval home watching television when his cable was severed. As he rose to see what was wrong with his television, 27 bullets went through Plescios's living room window, 16 of which struck him. At Plescio's funeral, a flower arrangement appeared bearing the word Bandidos, which was the first sign that the Bandidos Motorcycle Club of Texas was taking an interest in the Rock Machine.

On October 28, 1998. Police arrested 25 Rock Machine members and associates as they we're eating dinner in the restaurant of a downtown hotel. The men were forced to lie facedown on the ground, they were searched, and then placed under arrest. Richard Lagacé and Denis Belleau were among those arrested, many were freed the next day, after swearing to stay away from the others that were picked up by police.

Disaster struck the Dark Circle, when one of their number, Salvatore Brunnettii, a restaurateur, bar owner and drug dealer, defected to the Hells Angels and gave them a list of the remaining members of the Dark Circle which basically led to their collapse, leaving the Rock Machine and fragmented members of the "Alliance" to face the Hells Angels and their support clubs.

By 1999 the Rock Machine MC were seriously looking to align itself with longtime Hells Angels rivals the Bandidos Motorcycle Club as the other factions in the Alliance had been devastated, with the Rock Machine itself receiving substantial losses. During May 1999 the Rock Machine Motorcycle Club became a 'Hang-around" club for the Bandidos.

On 17 April 2000, Normand Hamel, one of the Nomads, was killed when attempting to flee from Rock Machine assassins in a Laval parking lot while he and his wife were taking his son to the doctor. He was the most senior member of the Hells Angels killed during the conflict. On 12 May 2000, the Angels tried to kill the two Rock Machine members, Tony Duguay and Denis Boucher, suspected of killing Hamel, leading to a wild car crash, during which Duguay took bullet wounds to his arms, right hand, and thigh. About forty police officers from the Carcajou squad raided the Rock Machine chapter in Beauport but found nothing worthwhile, and in June 2000, the Rock Machine set-up in Ontario began recruiting former members of the Outlaws Motorcycle Club.

In July 2000, Boucher's plans to set up an internet company were derailed when Robert "Bob" Savard, the loan shark who charged 52% interest on the loans he made to the desperate and needy, was gunned down at the Déjeuners Eggstra! restaurant in the north end of Montreal, Savard had been a Hells Angels associate for several years and was considered a right-hand man for Boucher. Savard's dinner companion, Normand Descoteaux, a hockey player turned loan shark, was also a target, but he survived by grabbing a waitress, Hélène Brunet, and using her as an involuntary human shield, ensuring that she took four bullets meant for him. Despite the way Brunet took bullets in her arms, legs and shin, Descoteaux was not charged. The shooter's were infamous Canadian hitman, Gerald Gallant and an unidentified associate of his. Gallant was employed by Michel Duclos, the leader of the Dark Circle and also frequently carried out contracts for the Rock Machine during the conflict with the Hells Angels, from 1980 to 2003, he was responsible for 28 murders and 13 attempted murders. His most active years were during the Quebec Biker War, where he killed two members of Hells Angels support clubs in 1997 and a third survived an assassination attempt. In 1998 when he eliminated five men, including Paul Cotroni Jr., son of deposed mob boss Frank Cotroni, making 1998 his most prominent year as a hitman, he also at periods worked for the Irish-Canadian West End Gang.

During this period both groups started to expand into Ontario with both opening several clubhouses. The Rock Machine would open three chapters in Ontario (Toronto, Kingston and Niagara Falls), the Loners had aligned themselves with the Rock Machine, holding a party in Toronto in June 2000 that was attended by dozens of "machinists", as the Rock Machine are known in outlaw biker circles. Also in June 2000 before the Hells Angels. Not wanting to lose ground to the Rock Machine in the province, Hells Angels opened its first clubhouse and in 2000 and gave a limited time offer to outlaw motorcycle clubs in Ontario(especially Satan's Choice and the Para-dice Riders). There would be no probationary period for Hells Angels club membership and all members would receive full-patch. This resulted in 168 members of the ParaDice Riders, Satan's Choice, Lobos and Last Chance "patching" to the Angels. Overnight the Hells Angels went from one chapter in Ontario to 14, giving them a massive advantage in the province. This gave the Hells Angels 29 chapters in total, with 418 full-patch members in Quebec, Ontario, Nova Scotia, Manitoba, Saskatchewan, Alberta and British Columbia.

On December 6, 2000, 255 police officers tracked and arrested 16 Rock Machine members and associates on narcotics trafficking charges. The "ring", operated by Marcel Demers Leader of the Beauport chapter and National president Fred Faucher of the Quebec City chapter, were accused of distributed more than two kilograms of cocaine a month and generated almost $5 million in profits annually(modern equivalent of $8,347,967). Alain Brunette would he promoted to the position of national president, until he became the first president of Bandidos Canada on December 1, 2001, Jean-Claude Belanger would replace Brunette as president of the Quebec City chapter. Robert Léger would head the Beauport chapter until his death. Also In December 2000, the Rock Machine officially became a probationary club of the Bandidos, seeing the division this caused the Hells Angels would approach the Alliance with the offer of a ceasefire brokered by the Rizzuto crime family, which was accepted. The truce had an ulterior motive for the Hells Angels as they hoped to halt the expansion of the Bandidos in Canada, especially Ontario. The Hells Angels would also convince members of the Rock Machine who did not agree with the "patch-over" to join them. The truce would last for only a brief period before hostilities continued.

In December 2000, most of the Rock Machine's Ontario members joined the Hells Angels. The Hells Angels national president, Walter Stadnick, offered the Hells Angels membership to the Rock Machine's Kingston and Toronto chapters while excluding the London chapter, saying that the members of the London chapter were unqualified to be Hells Angels. Most of the Ontario members of the Rock Machine took up Stadnick's offer as it was felt that the Bandidos patch with its cartoonish drawing of a Mexican bandit was "silly". Furthermore, Stadnick offered Hells Angels membership on a "patch-for-patch" basis, allowing members to trade their current patches for equivalent Hells Angels while the Bandidos required new members take a reduction in rank.  Paul "Sasquatch" Porter, a founding member of the Rock Machine and the president of their Kingston chapter, wrote on the wall of the clubhouse: "Hello to all the RMMC, I wish you the best with your new colors! Bye my brothers!" Porter became the president of the Hells Angels bew Ottawa chapter. The fact that the Hells Angels had conspired to kill Porter when he was a member of the Rock Machine did not stop him from defecting.

Regardless of the prior issues, on December 1, 2001. The Rock Machine Motorcycle Club became official members of the Bandidos Canada in a "Patch-Over" ceremony at the Rock Machine's Kingston chapter club house. The Bandidos Canada inherited seven new chapters(Montreal, Quebec City, Point-Aux-Trembles, Beauport, Toronto, Kingston and Niagara Falls). On March 28 of the same year, a massive investigation by Canadian authorities dubbed Operation Springtime was launched against the Hells Angels. The raids resulted in the arrests of 138 members of the Hells Angels including Maurice Boucher himself and associates connected with the motorcycle club. This brought about a power vacuum in the country's narcotics market.

The Bandidos Canada were looking to take advantage of this opportunity to regain territory lost and take new territory from the Hells Angels. However a concurrent investigation, Operation Amigo, was underway targeting the Bandidos Canada operations.  This operation had initially gone under a different title and was created to target the Rock Machine as a result of the conflict in Quebec. When The Rock Machine patched over to the Bandidos they became the main focus. On June 5, 2002, raids led to the arrests of 62 members of the Bandidos Canada (Rock Machine) including all of its Quebec manpower and many other associates.  This put an end to the conflict as it was the first time since the start of the war that both sides had large numbers of men and their respective leaders in custody and facing charges. All in all it is the deadliest recorded biker conflict in history with over 162 dead, over 300 wounded, 100 plus arrested and 20 people missing. It also cost the government of Canada and Quebec millions of dollars in damages with 84 bombings, and 130 cases of arson.

The 63 defendants, belonged mostly to the provinces of Quebec and Ontario. Ontario had 7 members arrested and 55 members we're arrested in  Quebec. They were charged with a series of crimes including; gangsterism, murder, conspiracy to murder, possession of weapons and trafficking in all possible types of narcotics: cannabis, hashish, cocaine, heroin, ecstasy, GHB, Viagra and even steroids. The results of the raids in Kingston, Toronto, Niagara, Montreal, Quebec City and Val-d'Or were fruitful, the authorities seized close to forty firearms, 197 kilos of hashish, fourteen kilos of cocaine, 200 marijuana plants, clothing and equipment with the colors of the Bandidos, CDs and books containing personal information about their opposition and over $125,000 in cash. The former Rock Machine had been trying for the last year, since operation Springtime, to recapture their territory, as well as claim territory that had become open when the Hells Angels were arrested. They had even made deals with the powerful Canadian Rizzuto crime family and the West End Gang to do just this, but the Quebec police did not give the opportunity.

Break from the Bandidos
On April 8, 2006, an event known as the Shedden massacre occurred. The incident saw the murders of eight prominent members of the Bandidos Canada at a farm house in Iona Station, located just outside of London, Ontario (it is referred to as the Shedden massacre because the bodies were dumped near the hamlet of Shedden). Following the massacre and preceding events, the Bandidos Canada closed its doors officially in October 2007. A failed attempt to get the club back on its feet by the then released Frank Lenti, lack of support from American and European Bandidos, and the Canadian members suspicions about their American counterparts involvement in the murders led to the closure. Later during 2008, it was confirmed by the president of the newly reformed Rock Machine, that there were still 27 members of the Bandidos that we're still active in Canada at the time, none of which were involved in the massacre.

The Rock Machine was reestablished in Ontario during late 2007, by several disgruntled members of the now-defunct Bandidos Canada, former members of the Rock Machine that were either being released from incarceration or had survived the 2002 crackdown and surviving members of the "No Surrender Crew". By 2008, the former members of the probationary Bandidos Winnipeg chapter became to call themselves Rock Machine. Former Mongols MC in Western Canada, mainly in Manitoba and Alberta joined the newly reformed Rock Machine, this accounted for the groups initial membership during its expansion west.

The Rock Machine was reformed under the guidance of Sean Brown, a former member of the Outlaws Motorcycle Club in Ontario. They reorganized the club as the Rock Machine Canada Nomads adopting the original black and platinum as their colors. The move was also intended as an insult toward the Bandidos United States and Bandidos National President Jeffrey Pike in particular, but the club gained unexpected momentum. During this period the members of the Rock Machine stuck true to their new name of "Nomads" and technically did not possess chapters in territorial locations but operated around the whole country. Brown stated: "The patch for the reborn Rock Machine also includes reference to the groups nomadic status, as members come from towns and cities across Canada."(that would all change as the club growth in popularity led them to reopen and create new chapters while still keeping the Nomads as a chapter for the clubs elite) In 2002 Project Amigo had led to the arrest of many Ontario and Quebec Bandidos. In 2003, they were forced to agree to a deal due to pressure from the Hells Angels, that they would retire from crime and discontinue any association with the Bandidos MC. Alex Caine, a Private investigator who has also at times been criticized for accuracy, had been keeping a close eye on the subject, also spoke with the Ottawa Citizen, he was told by the Rock Machine that it was these individuals that initially brought about the rebirth of the club.
"Eventually, these bikers came up with the idea of rebranding themselves as Rock Machine members, a move that they felt they would not negate the deal that they had made, but which left the Hells Angels feeling hoodwinked."

He went on to state that he was told by Sean Brown, that as time goes on original members are being released from prison and are rejoining the Rock Machine, by the 2008 he estimated that the club had somewhere around 100 members across Canada with over half being original members of the Rock Machine. Contrary to Jerry Langton's statement about the Rock Machine starting in Winnipeg during 2008 not Ontario in late 2007(the Rock Machine's current official website states it was reestablished in 2007), a timeline of key dates given by the Winnipeg Sun in an article covering the history of the Rock Machine in the province from 2008 to 2013, it shows that police monitored the first official gathering of the newly formed Rock Machine in Manitoba in late September 2008, and though they did confirm Langton's statement that the Manitoba Rock Machine initially had little connection with the rest of the club, interviews from the Ottawa Citizen given by the Ontario Rock Machine and the establishment of its Toronto and Kingston chapters predate the groups establishment in the province, with an article being released in early September 2008, showing that members of the Rock Machine from Australia had arrived in Winnipeg to help establish the chapter. Despite Langton stating that the Rock Machine website mentioned nothing of the original Rock Machine. Paul Cherry argues these claims. Cherry is a journalist for the Montreal Gazette (the primary sources for all media pertaining to the Quebec Biker War and its participants). He had covered the Rock Machine and Quebec Biker War extensively during the time of conflict. He later released an article, that supported Alex Caine's statement that the Rock Machine did indeed have a connection with first generation of the club. Cherry stated:

"The more recent version of the Rock Machine has ties to the past version. Its website lists three Canadian members in a section titled "Brother Behind Bars". One of the men is Danny Borris, 40, a resident of New Brunswick who is incarcerated. Borris was arrested by Montreal police, in 2002, in Operation Amigo."

The club would reopen its Toronto and Kingston chapters by April 2008 and an interview by Peter Edwards with the Toronto spokesperson for the Rock Machine revealed that it was yet to purchase a clubhouse but that the Toronto chapter had recruited around 24 members, while the Kingston chapter had over a dozen members. Together these chapters would be redubbed Ontario West and Ontario East chapters while Sean Brown's Rock Machine Nomads continued to operate out of the Ottawa area. The entire club would be reinforced by the patch over of a Canadian motorcycle club known as The Crew MC, which had chapters in Woodbridge and Huron County, Ontario  and also Western Canada, it was said that some of these were veteran bikers, however some new members had never been in a motorcycle club before.

At some point in early 2008, Sean Brown gave permission for Rock Machine chapters to be formed internationally in Australia and the United States, with each country establishing a Nomads chapter. In August 2008, now international president Sean Brown, also known as Crazy Dog agreed to an interview with the Ottawa Citizen, he stated the club contained former members of the Bandidos who were not associated with the Rock Machine beforehand and original Rock Machine members. Members who were being released from prison or joined while still incarcerated were instrumental in the revival of the club, despite the club's new rule set revolving around the inclusion of criminals in the organization. The Rock Machine were not willing to exclude former Bandidos or original members of the club that had been imprisoned. Even though they possessed criminal records, they claimed those joining would no longer be involved in criminal activities. He went on to state that the group was maintaining a low profile during their initial period of expansion and that the club "maintains a brotherhood and close association with the Western based Red Power." The Rock Machine have a different mentality and it is not the criminal organization it had been before.

The Rock Machine stated:
"We believe everybody deserves a second chance," a representative for the Rock Machine stated. "We won't throw our members out who are in jail. We don't abandon our brothers that are in jail."

Many dispute the Rock Machine's claims of leaving behind their criminal past including prominent Canadian crime journalist, Jerry Langton who argued that the Rock Machine had recruited Ron Burling into their ranks when he was already in prison serving a 17-year sentence for assault and kidnapping as he maintained that only a criminal organization would recruit a violent criminal such as Burling as a member. Typical of the members of the Rock Machine was Ron Burling, who had been selected to become the Rock Machine Winnipeg chapters first president, he was described by Langton as a man with a shaven head, bushy goatee beard, his entire body covered in tattoos except for his face and described him as a "physically huge man". Burling's Facebook profile described him as "a member of the Rock Machine Nomads" and his occupation as "Edmonton Maximum Security Penitentiary General Population". Burling had been convicted of a brazen kidnapping and assault. On 8 February 2005 as a member of the Bandidos Winnipeg chapter, Burling had smashed through the window of a car to remove a drug dealer named Adam Amundsen from his vehicle. Burling then beat Amundsen for several hours with a baseball bat and his fists to encourage him to pay back a $6,000 dollar drug debt owned to the Bandidos. In addition, Burling used a knife to slice off a tattoo off Amundsen's body and then finally used a sledgehammer to smash every bone in Amundsen's index finger and then cut off the tip of his finger. Burling was convicted of assault and kidnapping, and threatened both the judge and the crown attorneys with violence when his appeal was quashed. Burling tried to lift the bench to throw at somebody, but was tasered by the court marshals.

Edward Winterhalder, an ex-Bandido president who was involved in the process of patching in the original Rock Machine also gave his opinion on the clubs claims saying: “They have claimed that they have learned from the mistakes that were made in the past, that everybody involved in the new Rock Machine is going to have a job and they are not going to allow anybody to be selling drugs for a living.”

In September 2008(month after the interview with the Ottawa citizen). Two members of the Rock Machine Nomads chapter out of Australia, Michael Xanthoudakis and Eneliko Sabine were arrested at the Winnipeg Airport, they were in Manitoba on on request of the International Nomads to help establish the chapter in Winnipeg which consisted of former Bandidos, they told customs officials "they had arrived for a week-long fishing trip and were planning to meet up with an Internet buddy, who they knew only as "J.D." Fact's brought in by the immigration hearing that "they had flown halfway around the world at the invitation of several outlaw bikers from Ontario and Western Canada, who are in the process of setting up a new Canadian Rock Machine chapter." The Australian members for the Rock Machine were held by Canadian authorities and extradited back to Australia. The Rock Machine would be established in the province later that year regardless of the setbacks, with the chapter being created by former members of the Winnipeg Bandidos chapter which began calling themselves Rock Machine, they would be joined by former members of the Mongols from Manitoba and Alberta, which would form the clubs Edmonton chapter.

In late 2008, members of a motorcycle gang in Prince George, British Columbia known as the Game Tight Soldiers MC we're at a point one of the largest organized crime groups in Prince George, BC and we're constantly at odds with their rivals the Renegades MC, which acted as a Hells Angels support club. At one point the Game Tight Soldiers received large amounts negative publicity and police pressure for cutting off fingers of those who owed them money for narcotics debts and many crossed over to the Independent Soldiers who were also allied with the Hells Angels. Now weakened they were told by the Hells Angels to either leave Prince George or start to pay them for the right to work in the territory. Most of the Game Tight Soldiers led by their president, Steven Philip King, chose to relocate to Winnipeg to join the Rock Machine. However several articles including one from the Vancouver Sun stated that they fled to Ontario and joined the Rock Machine Toronto chapter there. This goes against Langton's claims that the group went to Winnipeg, however a picture shown in one of the news articles clearly shows him with a "Toronto" patch on his Rock Machine vest at the Outlaws Ottawa chapter 35th anniversary celebration.
 
Langton stated: The vast majority of the new Rock Machine were former members of the Bandidos and there is little connection with the first Rock Machine. In Manitoba, the former Bandido chapter in Winnipeg chose the name Rock Machine as a way of enraging the Hells Angels. Langton noted that the website for the Rock Machine had a section set aside for its dead members, which did not list a single member of the Rock Machine killed in the Quebec biker war, but instead listed the "Shedden 8" victims of the Shedden massacre. Langton wrote "These guys aren't the Rock Machine. they have little to do with them".  Langton also stated, based on information that he had received from authorities, that they were simply using the club's patch and had little connection. Some of the Rock Machine's chapters exist only on the internet, one policeman told Langton about the seemingly impressive number of chapters on the Rock Machine's website calling them "Internet bikers". (This was most likely due to the Suat Faction which has been accused of starting fake chapters and selling patches online).

Regardless the Manitoba Rock Machine would become much more aligned with national leadership during the presidency of Jay "Critical J" Strachan who would become President of the Winnipeg chapter after Ron Burling, he  was eventually elected International President of the Rock Machine after Sean Brown was voted out, this was due to his lack of wanting to expanding back into Quebec after their initial setup in Montreal, also the club did not like the soft approach that he was taking towards the Hells Angels, a policy of appeasement. Strachan had a deep respect for both the sacrifice made by the original members of the Rock Machine and the members of the slain No Surrender Crew(Rock Machine dubbed their remembrance patch "No Mercy Crew"). He instituted commemorative patches for both events, which members of the Nomads chapter wore on their jackets. These patches, especially the patch commemorating the Quebec Biker War are still worn by members worldwide in the current day.

The Rock Machine are estimated by authorities to have 300–400 members in the country as of 2022. The club spread across Canada and throughout several other countries worldwide including the United States, Australia, Germany, Russia, Switzerland, Hungary, Belgium, New Zealand, Sweden, Norway, France, South Africa, England, Spain, Georgia, Hong Kong, Kosovo, Kuwait, Armenia, Brazil, Indonesia, Thailand, Vietnam, Philippines and Turkey. As of 2022, the Rock Machine Motorcycle Club has established over 120 chapters, in 26 countries, on 5 continents since its inception.

The Rock Machine Motorcycle Club has also been responsible for the creation of several support clubs, such as The Palmers MC (1994–2002/now defunct).  Founded in Montreal, it was a participant in the Quebec Biker War, the SS Elite Motorcycle Club(2009–Present) a RM created support Club with rules and mentality modelled on the Waffen SS. It has had chapters in Ontario, Quebec, Manitoba and the United States, the Hell Hounds MC(2010–2013), New Bloods MC(2014–Present), Fearless Bandits MC (2015–Present) and Vendettas Motorcycle Club(2009–Present) founded in Manitoba by the RMMC.  Over the years it has become an international support club of the Rock Machine with chapters in Canada, Australia and Russia. As support clubs they are tasked with providing security and manpower, support, enforcement and logistics to any Rock Machine MC chapter. The support club reports to the mother chapter in Quebec but is also required to support local chapters across the country/world. For those that complete this task for the duration of the probationary period, they will receive request to become members of the Rock Machine Motorcycle Club. Most of these clubs shared the same colors, due to this the community is called the "Black and Platinum Family"

The current iteration of the Rock Machine MC maintains an enmity towards the Texas-based Bandidos, despite claims in Alex Caine's book The Fat Mexican that Rock Machine members in 2008 made a secret deal with high-ranking members of the Bandidos national chapter to re-open in Canada, as of 2022 the Bandidos have still not returned to Canadian soil. The Rock Machine claims to be just a motorcycle club. Langton dismissed these claims, arguing that the Rock Machine had recruited Ron Burling into their ranks when he was already in prison serving a 17-year sentence for assault and kidnapping as he maintained that only a criminal organization would recruit a violent criminal such as Burling as a member. In 2021, Detective Scott Wade of the Ontario Provincial Police's Anti-Biker Enforcement Unit called members of the Rock Machine "violent guys, but they weren't' established and organized".

Allies
Dubois Brothers - Rock Machine formed an alliance with the Dubois Gang in the 1980s, this would stay active throughout the Quebec Biker War.
Outlaws Motorcycle Club - The Outlaws motorcycle club had initially given minor support to the Rock Machine during the Quebec Biker War, The Outlaws were also fighting a conflict with the Hell's Angels during this period. An official alliance would be formed between the resurrected Rock Machine and the Outlaws in Manitoba during 2011.
Gremium Motorcycle Club - During the club's expansion into Europe, it made an alliance with Gremium MC, one of the largest motorcycle clubs in Germany.
Loners Motorcycle Club - A fellow Canadian-based international motorcycle club, an alliance between the two was established in the 2010s.
Vendettas Motorcycle Club - A RMMC created support club that was founded in Winnipeg, Manitoba. Serves as an international support club for the Rock Machine with chapters in Canada, Australia and Russia.
Manitoba Warriors - A Native-Canadian gang based in the Canada's prairies, an alliance was formed between the two groups during Rock Machine's expansion into Western Canada in 2008.
Rizzuto crime family (1986-1994) - When the Rock Machine was formed in 1986, its founders Salvatore and Giovanni Cazzetta, had family members in the mob, thus there was a very good relationship between the two groups until the arrest of Giovanni in 1993 and Salvatore in 1994.
West End Gang - Rock Machine formed a partnership with the Irish-Canadian gang in the 1980s, this would stay active throughout the Quebec Biker War.
Bandidos(formerly, 1999–2006) - The Rock Machine became a chapter of the Bandidos in mid 1999. After 18 months, they became an official probationary club, all members of the Rock Machine would be patched into the Bandidos on January 6, 2001. They would remain as a single entity until the events of the Shedden Massacre and the subsequent closure of the Bandidos MC Canada. The Rock Machine was reestablished by former Bandidos, Rock Machine(the Bandidos who had survived the 2002 crackdown) and disgruntled members of the Mongols Motorcycle Club.

Probationary clubs
Black Jackets (Germany, Europe) 
Ching-a-Ling MC (USA)
Kingsmen MC (USA)
North Island Gang (New Zealand) - patched over in 2013.
Manitoba Warriors (Canada)
Sadistic Souls Motorcycle Club (USA, New Zealand, Australia and England)
The Crew (Canada) - patched over in 2008
Tight Game Soldiers (Canada) - patched over in 2009.
Wrecking Crew MC (USA)

Support clubs
Avengers MC (USA)
Fearless Bandits MC (Alberta)
Hell Hounds MC (Manitoba, Alberta)
New Blood MC (Manitoba)
Palmers MC (Quebec and Ontario)
Platinum Crew MC (Sweden)
SS Elite Motorcycle Club (Canada and USA)
Silent Soldiers MC (Saskatchewan)
Vendettas Motorcycle Club (Canada USA, Russia, Serbia, Germany and Australia)

Rivals
Hells Angels(1986–2002) - The Hells Angels actions during the Lennoxville massacre, directly led to the creation of the Rock Machine Motorcycle Club itself. Despite this, the two clubs existed in relative harmony until the 1994 arrest of Rock Machine President, Salvatore Cazzetta. From 1994 to 2002, the Rock Machine and the Hells Angels would engage in the deadliest motorcycle conflict in history. This cemented their rivalry, there has been several sporadic incidents since then.
Rebels Motorcycle Club - The rivalry between the Rock Machine and the Rebels Motorcycle Club started when the Canadian club expanded into Australia, this saw the beginning of the Rock Machine-Rebels conflict.
Red Devils Motorcycle Club - the Red Devils are the official support club of the Hells Angels, they have had several incidents with the Rock Machine.
Bandidos Motorcycle Club (2011–present) - Tensions between the Bandidos and Rock Machine started in the mid-2000s, with the Shedden Massacre and the dissolution of the Bandidos Canada driving a wedge between the reemerging Rock Machine and their former ally. The rivalry would escalate into conflict in 2011, when the two clubs clashed for control of the German city of Ulm. There has since been several conflicts fought between the two groups in multiple countries.
WolfSSChanze Faction - A splinter faction of the Rock Machine led by Suat Erköse. The faction would change their emblem in 2022.
Alaska Vets Riding Club Support club of the Hells Angels.

Meeting with the Pagans
For decades the Pagans Motorcycle Club had looked north to Canada for possibility of expansion.  It also found the idea of supporting Hells Angels rivals beneficial.  The Rock Machine Motorcycle Club, a Canadian-based international motorcycle club with chapters all over the world, has fought several conflicts with the Hells Angels including the Quebec Biker War, the deadliest motorcycle conflict in history.  The Pagans deeply respected these feats and sought to establish a relationship with the Rock Machine. In 2011, dozens of the Pagans traveled to the Canadian province of New Brunswick to meet with the several chapters of the Rock Machine and other locals. At the time New Brunswick was a Canadian province that had little outlaw motorcycle influence.  The meeting was to consolidate a friendship and probe the province for expansion. However, in 2018, Pagans member, Andrew "Chef" Glick revealed that the group had abandoned its plans at expansion North, they cited Canada's anti-biker laws but also a large part of the reason was that Canadian Hells Angels are considered particularly violent members of the outlaw biker – or “one percenter” – community, Glick said in an interview.

“In Canada and Australia, that's where the heaviest (toughest) one per centers are,” Glick said. “Being a one per center in Canada, I would say is a little more dangerous than being a one per center in the U.S."  New Jersey bikers are tough, but “not near as violent as what I’ve seen and read (about) in Montreal and Toronto.”

Membership
Today the Rock Machine Motorcycle Club's Mother chapter resides in Canada. All official chapters follow the rules and regulations set out by the mother chapter.The United States has 2 mother chapters Connecticut being the Eastcost Mother chapter and Alaska being the Westcoast With recent updates and reformats to the club's official Constitution in 2022, the rules are much more stringent, more relatable to other high-profile biker groups such as the Hells Angels.

Earning membership and rules
Like most other Outlaw motorcycle clubs, members must own and operate a North American or British-made motorcycle with an engine of at least 1000cc, have valid insurance and “sufficient riding skills not to be a danger to themselves or others”. Members must also travel a minimum of 5,000 kilometers per year. All Chapters must follow and support Canada as the Motherland and fulfill all requests sent from Canada. “To earn their full patch membership, (a potential member) must also travel to the Mother Chapter of Quebec.”

In order to become a Rock Machine prospect in Canada rules are particularly strict, candidates must have a valid license, a motorcycle and have the right set of personal qualities. They are not allowed to use social media to post any pictures or make any comments relating to the club, they cannot contact members of any other clubs this must be left to a Full-patch member. Prospects must also leave their "old lady" at home.

After a period of trial a prospective member is first deemed to be a "hang-around", indicating that the individual is invited to some club events or to meet club members at known gathering places. If the hang-around is interested, he may be asked to become an "associate", a status that usually lasts a year. At the end of that stage, he is reclassified as "prospect", participating in some club activities, but not having voting privileges while he is evaluated for suitability as a full member. Ending in highest membership status, is "Full Membership" or "Full-Patch". Fees are typically around $100 a month, except for prisoners, whose fees are not charged.

Nomads and officers
In the Rock Machine Motorcycle Club, Nomads are ranked officers. Anyone who has experience and excels in the club has the potential to become a Nomad. They play several vital roles including serving as a role model to other members. Nomads are spread all over any particular country the Rock Machine is operating in. They are tasked with setting up meetings, solving issues within chapters and scouting areas for expansion. Nomads will usually arrive ahead of time to establish a relationship and help set up a chapter. Unlike some other motorcycle clubs in the Rock Machine, a Nomad can also belong to a chapter. While though the chapter might have a president, Nomads are usually the highest-ranking officer in clubs ranking and thus highest in the chapter. In the Rock Machine, a member can be a chapter president, vice president, lieutenant, secretary, sergeant at arms, treasurer or a road captain and thus an officer without possessing status as a Nomad. When it comes to National Nomad chapters, usually the president of said chapter is also the president of the club in that country, unless it contains multiple Nomad chapters. The hierarchy of the Nomads consists of an International Nomads chapter operated out of Canada. Most Nomad chapters look to it for direction and instruction. When it comes to establishing chapters, the Rock Machine Motorcycle Club operates as an independent motorcycle club, Nomads will select a suitable location and will go about establishing a chapter. The president of the Hawksbury chapter made a comment during an interview stating,

“We are an independent biker group, like the Outlaws or the Mongols. We don't pay any odds to the Hells Angels. When I want to open a new chapter, I don't need to ask their permission."

Patches
Back
The top rocker patch - A patch containing the name of the club
The bottom rocker patch - A patch containing the territory of the club or chapter
The "MC" patch - A patch containing the letters MC, showing the groups distinction as a Motorcycle Club it is placed to the lower right of the center patch.
Club emblem or center patch - Usually a large patch containing the motorcycle clubs emblem, it placed on the center of the back.
Back and front
The "1% Diamond" patch - A patch worn by outlaw motorcycle clubs to display their status as a member of the 1% of riders the AMA denounced. It contains the symbols "1%" and usually contains the initials of the club "RM" within a diamond. Depending one the member is either worn on the just the front or both.
Front and sides
The club patch - A small patch on the top right displaying the name of the club.
The country patch - A small patch worn on the top right displaying the country of the member.
The "Club Office" or ranking patch - A small patch that displays the rank of a member within the club.
The "A.L.V.A.L.M" patch - A small patch containing the letters "A.L.V.A.L.M" which stands for the Rock Machine's motto "À La Vie À La Mort", or "To the Life Until Death".
The "Side Rocker" patch - A patch containing the chapter or territory, some members can wear several side rockers including a larger "A.L.V.A.L.M" patch or "SS ELITE SS" for those who earned it.
The "SS" lightning bolt patch - A patch containing the Schutzstaffel double lightning bolt, it is one in part to the clubs historical roots in the SS Motorcycle Club.
The "666" patch - A patch containing the number six, three times, which is seen is a mark of Satan.
The RMFFRM patch - patch containing the phrase "RMFFRM" which stands for Rock Machine Forever, Forever Rock Machine. These come on both a side rocker and a smaller patch that also contains a 1% diamond.
The collar patches - two small replicas of the Rock Machine's eagle, that go on either side of the vests collar, they come in both platinum and gold for higher-ranking members.
The "NFNF" patch - The club also has a patch that either displays the Nazi German Schutzstaffel's Totenkopf (skull and crossbones) or a white hand grenade surrounded in a red circle (newer) with Schutzstaffel "SS" on each side, it is surrounded by the statement "Never Forgive Never Forget NFNF" in reference to their war with the Hells Angels.
The International Nomads patch - A circular patch that contains the text "Rock Machine International Nomads", it also contains a gold eagle's head
The "Seek and Destroy" patch - Is the Rock Machine's equivalent of the Hells Angels "Filthy Few" patch, it is awarded for bravery.
The "Founding Father" patch:  recognizable by the inscription "Founding Father" followed by the continent and a black eagle. There are only five Rock Machine members in the world who wear such a patch. One on each continent.
The Quebec biker War remembrance patch - A patch containing the phrase "In Memory Of Quebec 1994-2002".
The "No Mercy Crew" patch - Started in commemoration of the No Surrender Crew, who were massacred in 2006, worn by members of the Manitoba chapter.
The "Dead City" chapter patch - A remembrance patch for the members of Rock Machine chapter 13, also known as the Dead City chapter. The patch is cross-shaped the words through the center "DEAD 13 CITY", with "RM" and "CREW" above and below it respectfully.
Individual remembrance patch - A patch made specifically for a fallen member, it usually contains their name and the years they were born and pasted away.

Past members
Well-known former members of the Rock Machine included Salvatore Cazzetta, Giovanni Cazzetta, Claude Vézina, Paul Porter, Andrew Sauvageau, Marcel Demers, Richard "Bam-Bam" Lagacé (deceased), Johnny Plescio (deceased), Tony Plescio (deceased), Renaud Jomphe former president of the Montreal chapter (deceased), Martin Bourget, Serge Pinel, Frédéric Faucher. Alain Brunette, who would become the first national president of the Canadian Bandidos in 2001 and Peter Paradis, who later testified for the Crown at the trials of other members, in the club's 15 years of existence he would be its first member to turn crown's evidence.

The Rock Machine was merged with the Bandidos Motorcycle Club on January 6, 2001, in a patch-over ceremony located at the Rock Machine's Kingston chapter clubhouse. It was overseen by high-ranking Bandidos member Edward Winterhalder. They remained Bandidos for seven years. Around ten Rock Machine members at the time joined their former arch-enemy, the Hells Angels, due to the Bandidos refusal to grant full members status to "Full-Patch" members of the Rock Machine forcing them to become probationary members of the Bandidos and take a reduction in ranking, this angered some members along with abandoning the Rock machine namesake for a Texas-based entity, it was felt by some that the Bandidos patch with its cartoonish drawing of a Mexican bandit was "silly". Furthermore, Stadnick offered Hells Angels membership on a "patch-for-patch" basis, allowing members to trade their current patches for equivalent Hells Angels. Many Rock Machine had gained respect from the Hells Angels that they had faced during the conflict and saw them as a better alternative.

Notable members who defected to the Angels included original members Paul Porter and Andrew Sauvageau. "Full-Patch" members Gilles Lambert, Nelson Fernandes, Bruce Doran(who founded the Kingston chapter) and Fred Faucher's brother Jean Judes Faucher. Fernandes would die of cancer within months of becoming a Hells Angel. Upon his release, club founder Salvatore Cazzetta joined Hells Angels in 2005, as the Rock Machine had merged with the Bandidos and was no longer active at the time.

Jean Paul Beaumont, a Sargent at Arms for the Rock Machine Winnipeg chapter was tragically killed in 2012.

Issues
Some of the current issues that the club faces is an inconsistency in official international and national leadership. An individual out of Germany by the name of Suat Erköse, a former police officer and former member of the Bandidos Motorcycle Club (who had attempted to assassinate him in 2011), claimed to be the Rock Machine Motorcycle Club world president without any permission or vote from the Mother chapter. He was apparently given permission by Jean F. Emard, a member who claimed that he left the motorcycle club in 2015, and never received a status beyond Prospect officially. Emard has been mentioned several times by news agencies to be the leader of the Rock Machine, but he is not recognized by its official leadership as a legitimate member. Suat, the self-proclaimed world president, has also been accused by the Rock Machine world community of selling club merchandise online and profiting from it. Michael Green a spokesperson for TBM Nation said
 
"Rock Machine MC will ALWAYS and FOREVER be on Canadian soil and Mother Country and Mother Chapter will always and forever be in CANADA.

Rock Machine MC was built by Canadians and the real and true World President today is Prophet Rock.

Suat Erköse is NOT the World President for the Rock Machine MC – he got his "leadership" through Jean Emard, who also is one big fake RMMC, that's the true facts.

I have made this post in respect of all our real and true Canadian Rock Machine MC Brothers to show them the RESPECT they all deserve, and to all the fallen Canadian Rock Machine MC Brother's who gave their lives to keep the eagle flying.

NO ONE outside Canada can and will not ever be World President of the Rock Machine MC – Only a Canadian can and will be the TRUE and, REAL World President of the Rock Machine MC."

in 2020, the Mother Chapter released an official statement denouncing the fraudulent world president and any chapters that follow his lead, but also said that they would be more than willing to unify and consolidate with all chapters of the Rock Machine MC as long as they are willing to follow the Mother chapters rules and regulations. Just recently having had an election, a representative stated "We are now under one governing body, with an elected National President. We will not fail."

Rock Machine Motorcycle Club Mother chapter statement:

"Although we do not follow, or recognize, Suat as our world leader, we will be open to communication with all Rock Machine Chapters around the world. Public bashing, via social media or any other form of public communication, of any Rock Machine Member will cease in Canada.

Membership in Canada will only be granted by Canadian Members to those who have followed proper protocol to receive their membership. As Canada is the Mother Country, we will also grant membership to other countries who have committed to follow the Rock Machine Canada Constitution. We were founded in Canada. Quebec was and will always be the Mother Chapter.

We are brothers from many different backgrounds, united under the Eagle by our beliefs. We govern as brothers under a true democracy. We are a true brotherhood. Rock Machine Canada is united. We will stand tall; we will stand proud. We will stand until the end of time. Much respect to all brothers for their hard work, dedication to our club, and courage to rebuild the greatest club on earth."

A statement later released by the former International Nomads president, known only as Rude Boy, cleared up the history behind the situation. In 2013, the police cracked down on the Rock Machine in Canada. The subsequent raids by police in Manitoba and Quebec resulted in most of the clubs hierarchy being incarcerated. Operation Dilemma in Manitoba led to the arrest of most of the Rock Machine Winnipeg chapter in January 2013, including international president, Joseph "Critical J" Strachan, and due to this he was forced to step down from his position. In Spring 2013,  an operation against a large network of narcotics traffickers who operated in Montérégie was launched. The Sûreté du Québec raided the club in Quebec which led to the arrest of 15 members of the Rock Machine Quebec, from two separate chapters. This included high-ranking members of the club. Several members of the support club, SS Elite Motorcycle Club were also arrested, all were sentenced on narcotics charges.

Strachan nominated "Rude Boy", who was a Nomad and high-ranking member from Ontario, he was voted in as the new Rock Machine International president. Around this time the split in the Rock Machine Germany had occurred, with Suat Erköse claiming to be the president of Europe without vote. This was a concern to Rude Boy, who had heard rumors that Erköse had formerly been a police officer in Germany. As a security precaution he began to share this information with other chapters and members of the club, telling them that until the rumors were either confirmed or denied, they should not share any vital club information with Erköse. Unfortunately Jean-François Emard, who was a member of the Toronto chapter at the time, chose to take this information to Erköse for personal gain.

Emard and Erköse then began to use the internet to spread rumors and slandered Rude Boy and former club leader Critical J, which have since been disproven according to Rude Boy. Jean-François Emard claimed to be a Nomad in the club, which Rude Boy highly disputes, there is a policy within the Rock Machine Constitution that states a member must be a part of the club for a 5-year period before they received the availability Nomad [unless they are probationary with experience]. Rude Boy claimed Emard had only been in the Rock machine for a matter of months at the time and therefore could never have been ranked as a Nomad, the qualifications for international Nomad are even stricter, a member needs a unanimous vote from the international chapter. Rock Machine Ontario member, Stephan Martin acting on behalf of Erköse, stole Rude Boys Rock Machine vest while he was absent from his home, they then proceeded to tell the international Rock Machine community they had stripped him of it. With the rumours now circulating, Emard was attempting to convince members to cast a vote of no confidence against Rude Boy, Critical J and several other prominent members on behalf of Erköse, but apparently no vote occurred and they were removed anyway. It seems none of the Ontario members agreed to this as they would be removed by Suat. They would both be removed from the club by February 14, 2014. A Facebook post from Erköse's Rock Machine stated, that all Rock Machine chapters in Ontario had been frozen and that leaders Rude Boy, Stephan Martin and Concho were placed "out in bad standing". With Rude Boy and other high-ranking members either in jail or out of the club because of Emard's actions, Suat Erköse was able to claim the title of International president. For his efforts Jean-François Emard was given a spot on the "World Chapter" and was made the president of Erköse's faction in Canada until 2018, with his chapters either dissolving or rejoined the official Rock Machine.

"I am the former RMMC International President. I was the International Nomads president and that title was not only earned through blood, sweat and jail time, but I was actually nominated for and voted in after Critical J stepped down from the position. A man who I have mad love and respect for and can not wait till he is released from prison. Suat is 100% a fraud, his title was not earned but was stolen from me. I heard rumors of Suat being a former police officer, so i did what any good 1%er would do. I passed along the message to other chapters that the rumor is not yet confirmed so do not act on it, but while I am looking in to the accusation keep him on the back burner and do not share any club business or information until the rumor can be confirmed or disproven. JF decided to go behind my back team up with police constable Suat and have me thrown out of the club with no vote i was a Nomad, JF nor Suat were Nomads, JF claimed to be a Nomad, not sure how because he was not in the club long enough to pass the prospect stage let alone the mandatory minimum 5 year as a full patch, as RM Constitution states. Then you have to be picked and sponsored by another Nomad and the vote has to be made by the entire Nomad chapter and it has to be a 100%. Yes if even one Nomad votes no, you do not get Nomad status.

These two clowns used the internet to spread rumors about myself and Critical J, claiming all kinds of laughable things witch have all been disproven. They had no proof, not one piece of paper work on myself or CJ. We were both removed. No vote, no nothing, JF claimed to be a Nomad, but was only in the club a few months lol. By the RM Constitution, he would still be a prospect not a fucking Nomad. but anyone who knew me never believed any of it, I was not new to the scene and my legal name is well known and respected. I'm a former member of the Canadian Armed Forces for 10 plus years and a former mixed martial artist, with 84 fights over a 15 year period. With a 72-12 record, I joined the Rock Machine Motorcycle Club, I was a respected member for close to 10 years and rose quickly through the ranks, then came along Jean Emard or JF they call him (I assumed JF was short form for JUST a FAKE). They were also talking to my girlfriend behind my back, talking shit. The loyal solid brothers that they are. Which is a rule that will get you out in bad standing, they both also have done countless interviews, another rule that will get you kicked out.

Were a outlaw club, we live in the shadows, these two clowns have more internet coverage then ken and Barbie.. Like what the fuck, they got Stephen Martin from Trenton, Ontario to steal my patch while i was out of town and told everyone that they smashed me out for it... I responded by posting my address on the internet and inviting anyone who thought I deserved any of this, to come any time and we will film and post the results. Needless to say no one came and because of what was done to me, 18 Ontario [Rock Machine] members, that I personally recruited, life time friends, most ex-military and MMA fighters, quit and either retired or went to another club. See we had a good thing in Ontario, pure warriors and two guys with laptops and vivid imaginations ruined it all. Here's a lesson Suat, just because real outlaws live in the shadows like the saying goes, it's the quiet ones you have to watch out for, because our Ontario guy's don't polish there bikes or put on a spotless new vest, break out the hair gel and blow dryer to post 1000 Facebook selfies, [we are] most likely the real deal. Some advice [Suat], quit the club because Walmart is hiring catalogue models, seems your qualified. Shout out to all the real Rock Machine, I miss and love you.

LOVE AND RESPECT 
1%ER RUDE BOY

In early 2022, Suat's Rock Machine faction stopped using the club's official emblem and created a new three-piece patch, with no association to the rest of the club, while still denouncing the rest of the official Rock Machine club. His website was subsequently taken offline as well as the fake Rock Machine's Facebook page. As of October 2022, a reunification campaign was launched under the slogan "One Name One Game" or "One Name One Family". With the official membership, Suat Erköse faction and other factions all seemingly committed to the goal, unity, combined cooperation and brotherhood. The former president of the Rock Machine in the United States, and a member of the US National chapter in Connecticut commented during an interview. He believed the Rock Machine had a bright future on the horizon. "Everyone is coming together, we have a lot of like-minded individuals, the closer we get, the closer we get to bringing everyone together and becoming one club again. Get rid of the factions and become one Rock Machine again. And I think that with the people that we have right now it's pretty doable."

Chapters worldwide

The club has more than 140 active chapters worldwide.

Canada (21)

World-wide/Country-wide
RMMC International Nomads
RMMC Nomads Canada
RMMC Militia Nomads chapter
RMMC Infantry Nomads chapter
Alberta 
Edmonton
Calgary
Medicine Hat (Death Valley chapter)
Lethbridge
British Columbia
Vancouver
Lower Mainland
New Brunswick
Saint John
RMMC 506 chapter (506 Crew)
Ontario
Windsor
Kawartha (Vengeance chapter)
Huron County (Redemption chapter)
Capital City chapter (Ottawa)
Quebec
Montreal (Original Mother chapter)
Sherbrooke (Current Mother chapter)
Quebec City
Trois-Rivières
Dead City chapter (Chapter 13)
Elite chapter
Manitoba
Winnipeg (Murder-Peg chapter)
Saskatchewan
Regina (Psycho City chapter)

International (7)

RMMC International Nomads(based in Canada) – Estimated to be over 100 world-wide
RMMC Militia Nomads(based in Canada) – Estimated to be 100+ world-wide
RMMC Infantry Nomads
RMMC Death Squad Chapter(based in Lippstadt, Germany) 
RMMC Empire Nomads Chapter
RMMC Viking Nomads Chapter
RMMC South America Nomads (Brazil)
RMMC European Nomads Chapter (Frozen)

Other chapters (111)

Australia (13)
Perth 
South Perth
Melbourne (Badlands) 
Clayton South
Sydney (NSW chapter)
Sydney West (Rock City)
Tasmania
Queensland
Gold Coast
Adelaide 
Sin City chapter
Forbidden City chapter
Nomads Australia
Armenia (1)
Yerevan
Belgium (4)
RMMC Belgium Chapter
Badtown chapter
Militia Nomads chapter (Belgium)
Nomads Belgium
Brazil (3)
RMMC Brazil chapter (São Paulo area)
Militia Nomads chapter (Brazil)
Nomads Brazil
France (5)
Paris
Mozell
Alsace
Militia Nomads chapter (France/ Metz)
Nomads France
Germany (18)
Germany Southwest (Freiburg)
Sigmaringen
Hessen Rock
Midland chapter
Ruhr Area chapter (Essen)
Stuttgart
Southeast
Munich
Bad City chapter
Westend  
Nomads Germany 
WolfSSChanze Chapter (Erköse faction)
Battlefield chapter (Ulm, Erköse faction)
Valhalla chapter (Erköse faction)
Dardania (Blue RM Mother chapter)
Neu-Ulm (Blue RM)
Germany Central (Ulm, Blue RM)
RMMC Blue Nomads (Farben)
Great Britain (2)
RMMC England Chapter (London area)
Nomads Great Britain
Georgia (2)
Tbilisi (Russian RMMC Chapter)
Tbilisi (Georgian RMMC Chapter)
Hungary (1)
Budapest
Hong Kong (1)
Hong Kong City
Indonesia (3)
Bali
Djakarta
Bali Nomads
Italy (1) (Formerly probationary)
European Nomads
Kosovo (2)
Dardania
Nomads Kosovo
Kuwait (1)
RMMC Nomads Kuwait 
New Zealand (2)
Christchurch
Nomads New Zealand
New Caledonia (1)
RMMC South Pacific chapter (Numea)
Norway (8)
Stavanger
Emmen
Sapmi
Oslo
Klubben
Eastside chapter
Militia Nomads chapter (Norway)
Nomads Norway
Jessheim (Frozen)
Philippines (1)
RMMC Nomads Philippines
Romania (3)
Bucharest
Westland chapter (Timișoara)
Nomads Romania
Russia (9)
Moscow
Moscow North (Zelenograd)
Southland chapter
Krasnodar
Kazan
St. Petersburg
Vladivostok
Militia Nomads chapter (Russia)
Nomads Russia
Serbia (2)
RMMC Serbia chapter (Belgrade)
Nomads Serbia
South Africa (2)
RMMC South Africa chapter (Cape Town)
Nomads South Africa (Johannesburg)
Spain (2)
Gerona
Nomads Spain
Sweden (9)
East Gothia
Scaniae
Wasteland chapter (Klippan)
Perstorp
Kalmar
Karlskrona
Kristianstad
Stockholm (Capital City)
Nomads Sweden (Hyllstofta)
Switzerland (1)
Nomads Switzerland
Thailand (2)
RMMC Thailand chapter (Bangkok)
Nomads Thailand
Turkey (2)
Militia Nomads chapter (Turkey)
Nomads Turkey
United States (13)
Connecticut
Florida (Miami)
Alaska
Idaho
Missouri
Oklahoma
Northern Carolina
Southern Carolina
Virginia
New York
Pennsylvania
Arizona
Militia Nomads chapter (USA)
Nomads USA
Vietnam
Ho Chi Minh City (Frozen)

Original, frozen, formerly probationary chapters (59)

International/Continental (1)
RMMC European Nomads (Frozen)

Canada (26)
Ontario
Toronto (Original Rock Machine chapter, est. 2000)
Kingston (Original Rock Machine chapter, est. 2000)
Niagara Falls (Original Rock Machine chapter, est. 2000)
Ottawa (Frozen, first chapter of the revived Rock Machine, est. Late 2007)
Ontario West/Kingston (Frozen, reestablished 2008)
Ontario East/Toronto (Frozen, reestablished 2008)
Woodbridge (Merged, est. 2008)
Hamilton (Relocated, est. 2010)
Markham (Frozen, est. 2010)
Peterborough (Frozen, est. 2010)
Quinte (Frozen)
Hawkesbury (Frozen)
Casselman (Frozen)
Vengeance, Ottawa (Frozen)
Quebec
Montreal (Original Mother chapter, est. 1986, reestablished in 2008)
Quebec City (Original Rock Machine chapter, est. 1988, reestablished in the 2010)
Point-Aux-Trembles (Original Rock Machine chapter, est. 1993)
Beauport (Original Rock Machine chapter, est. 1996)
Val-d'Or (Original Rock Machine chapter, probationary 1998)
Gosford (Frozen)
13th Legion chapter (Frozen)
Lanaudière (Merged)
Gaspé (Frozen)
Farnham (Frozen)
Gatineau (Formerly probationary)
New Brunswick
Moncton (Merged)
Nova Scotia
Halifax (Frozen, est. 2009)
Cape Breton (Frozen, est. 2010)
Manitoba
Eastside (Frozen, est. 2012)
Brandon (Merged)
Thompson (Merged)
Faction
RMMC Black & White Faction (Montreal, dissolved 2022)
Australia (4)
Australian Capital Territory/Canberra (Merged, est. 2011)
Australia West (Merged, est. 2011)
Northern Territory (Merged, est. 2011)
Australia South (Merged, est. 2011)
Germany (14)

Rock Machine Germany
Farben/South Baden (Became Blue RM, First chapter in Germany, original Mother chapter)
Germany Nomads North (Merged, est. 2011)
Germany Nomads South (Merged, est. 2011)
Germany Nomads East (Merged, est. 2011)
Germany Nomads West (Merged, est. 2011)
Germany Westside (Merged with Westend, est. 2012)
Dardania (Became Blue RM mother chapter)
Badlands chapter (Merged, est. 2012) 
South Central (Frozen, est. 2012)
Darkside chapter (Merged, est. 2014)
North Gate chapter (Frozen, est. 2014)
Southend (Freiburg, frozen, est. 2014)
Ruhrpott (Frozen)
Lörrach (Frozen)
Militia Nomads chapter (Frozen, Germany)
Blue Rockmachine
South Gang (Frozen)
United States (15)
Nevada (Frozen, est. 2009)
Minnesota (Merged, est. 2010)
New Mexico (Frozen, est. 2010)
Kansas (Frozen, est. 2011)
Colorado (Frozen, est. 2011)
Wyoming (Frozen, est. 2011)
California (Frozen, est. 2012)
Arkansas (Frozen, est. 2012)
Mississippi (Frozen, est. 2012)
North Illinois (Frozen, est. 2012)
Central Illinois (Frozen, est. 2012)
South Illinois (Merged, est. 2012)
Tennessee (Frozen, est. 2013)
Texas (Frozen, est. 2013)
Las Vegas (Frozen, est. 2016, Erköse faction)
New Hampshire (Frozen)

Criminal allegations and incidents

Since its rebirth, the Rock Machine maintains that it is a group of motorcycle enthusiasts and claim that it now dismisses members who are involved in known crimes or criminal activity. Any members that do commit crimes, do so without the club's permission. Many law enforcement agencies and journalists criticize these claims. For an in-depth list on allegations and incidents please see Rock Machine MC criminal allegations and incidents.

See also
List of outlaw motorcycle clubs
List of gangs in Canada

References

Further reading

External links
 Best bicycle for bigger guys
 Mongoose malus weight limit
 How fast is 100cc dirt bike
 York University's Nathanson Center for the Study of Organized Crime and CorruptionDead Link

 
1986 establishments in Quebec
Organizations established in 1986
Organizations based in Montreal
Outlaw motorcycle clubs
Motorcycle clubs in Canada
Bandidos Motorcycle Club